MSCO is an acronym that can mean either:
Military Sealift Command Office
Modeling and Simulation Coordination Office
Murmansk Shipping Company
My Summer Car Online